Super-Villain Team-Up is the name of two American comic book series published by Marvel Comics.  Both series featured supervillains as the protagonists.

Publication history
The first series started in 1975 with two giant-size issues before launching as a regular series, and was mostly bi-monthly during its existence. It initially teamed up Doctor Doom and the Sub-Mariner, who had lost his own series, from which it picked up the unresolved plots, especially that of the comatose Atlanteans. After a succession of writers and artists and a crossover with The Avengers, the plot gets resolved in issue #13 when Doctor Doom revives the Atlanteans, thus dissolving his alliance with the Sub-Mariner.

Issue #14 (Oct. 1977), which featured Magneto and Doctor Doom, was billed as the final issue of the series and its plotline was resolved in The Champions #16. The following year, SVTU continued with issue #15 (Nov. 1978), a reprint of Astonishing Tales #4–5. Issues #16 (May 1979) and #17 (June 1980) featured the Red Skull and the Hate-Monger. The irregular publishing frequency of the final three issues was due to a legal maneuver to prevent DC Comics from trademarking the term "super-villain".
 
The series saw the death of the Sub-Mariner's 1940s sweetheart Betty Dean and the death of her murderer, Doctor Dorcas. Steve Englehart created The Shroud, a character partly inspired by Batman, shortly before he started to work for DC Comics on Detective Comics.

Issues

Super-Villain Team-Up: MODOK's 11
In 2007 Marvel published Super-Villain Team-Up: MODOK's 11, a five-issue miniseries featuring 11 supervillains in the manner of the movie Ocean's Eleven.

Doctor Doom and the Masters of Evil
This 2009 miniseries features Doctor Doom working with other villains.

 #1 - Doctor Doom collaborates with the Sinister Six (Doctor Octopus, the Chameleon, Kraven the Hunter, Mysterio, the Sandman, and the Vulture)
 #2 - Doctor Doom collaborates with the Circus of Crime to beat Baron Zemo's Masters of Evil to a Hittite temple.
 #3 - Doctor Doom and his "Masters of Evil" clash with Blastaar.
 #4 - Doctor Doom collaborates with Magneto and Princess Python to steal an item from Selene.

Collected editions
 Essential Super-Villain Team-Up collects Giant-Size Super-Villain Team-Up #1–2 and Super-Villain Team-Up #1–17, 552 pages, September 2004,  
 Super-Villain Team-Up: MODOK's 11 collects Super-Villain Team-Up: MODOK's 11 #1–5, 120 pages, February 2008, 
 Doctor Doom and the Masters of Evil collects Doctor Doom and the Masters of Evil #1–4, 120 pages, July 2009, 
 Super-Villains Unite: The Complete Super-Villain Team-Up collects Giant-Size Super-Villain Team-Up #1–2; Super-Villain Team-Up #1–14, 16–17; The Avengers #154–156; Champions #16, 464 pages, March 2015,

References

External links
 
 
 
 Super-Villain Team-Up at the Unofficial Handbook of Marvel Comics Creators

1975 comics debuts
1980 comics endings
2007 comics debuts
2007 comics endings
Comics by Fred Van Lente
Comics by Keith Giffen
Comics by Roy Thomas
Comics by Steve Englehart
Defunct American comics
Marvel Comics titles
Supervillains with their own comic book titles
Team-up comics
Doctor Doom